Polt Darbon (also Romanized as Polţ Dārbon and Polt Dārbon; also known as Polt Dārīn) is a village in Do Hezar Rural District, Khorramabad District, Tonekabon County, Mazandaran Province, Iran. At the 2006 census, its population was 58, in 17 families.

References 

Populated places in Tonekabon County